Frans Kokshoorn (The Hague, 18 June 1920 - Oegstgeest, 25 November 2007) was a Dutch television actor, known for his roles in Q & Q and Bassie & Adriaan.

References

1920 births
2007 deaths
Dutch male television actors
Male actors from The Hague
20th-century Dutch people